Mid-Ohio Opera is an opera production company based in Mansfield, Ohio. Mid-Ohio Opera was incorporated in 2014. The company uses contemporary stagings of classic repertory. Mid-Ohio Opera tries to use non-traditional venues in a "pop-up" fashion. A registered 501c3, they rely on community support, corporate sponsorship, and grants.

Mid-Ohio Opera has a support guild and a community opera chorus.

Performances
 Coffee Cantata, J.S. Bach 2014
 Il Pagliacci, Leoncavallo 2014
 Die Winterreise, F. Schubert 2015
 L'Elisir D'Amore, G. Donizetti 2015
 Hopera! - Beer. Opera. Feast!
 In Good Company (With The Richland Academy of the Arts RADE dancers.)
 Madama Butterfly, Puccini 2016
 Evensong 10/04/16
 Schubert and Schnitzel 10/22/16
 Christmas Oratorio, Camille Saint-Saëns 12/11/16
 La Boheme 2017
 Messiah 2017
 Il Tabarro 2018
 Un Ballo in Maschera 2018
 TEDx Mansfield, OH: Featured Performers 2018
 Messiah 2018
 Die Fledermaus 2018
 Death and Everyman 2019
 Cosi Fan Tutti 2019
 Carmen 2019
 Messiah 2019
 Bluebeard's Castle 2020 
 Remainder of the 2020 Schedule was cancelled, due to Covid-19 pandemic.
 2021 Schedule - Porgy & Bess, Abduction from the Seraglio.

External
Mid-Ohio Opera

@midohioopera

http://www.facebook.com/midohioopera

References

American opera companies
Theatre companies in Ohio
2014 establishments in Ohio
Mansfield, Ohio